Kennett High School may refer to a school in the United States:

 Kennett High School (New Hampshire), in Conway, New Hampshire
 Kennett High School (Pennsylvania), in Kennett Square, Pennsylvania